Julian Knowle and Marcelo Melo were the defending champions, but Knowle chose not to participate.  Melo played alongside Max Mirnyi, but lost in the semifinals to Dominic Inglot and Florin Mergea.
Raven Klaasen and Leander Paes won the title, defeating Inglot and Mergea in the final, 7–6(7–1), 6–4.

Seeds

Draw

Draw

References
 Main Draw

ATP Auckland Open
Heineken Open - Doubles
Heineken Open - Doubles
2015 Heineken Open